Jabez Bunting Snowball (24 September 1837 – 24 February 1907) was a businessman, the 11th Lieutenant Governor of New Brunswick, Canada, and politician from the Town of Chatham, New Brunswick. He operated a number of businesses in the eastern part of the province and was one of its most prominent citizens.

Early life 

Snowball  came to the Miramichi Valley from Lunenburg, Nova Scotia when his father, a Methodist Minister, answered a call to St. Luke's Church in Chatham.

Snowball attended Wesleyan Academy in Sackville, New Brunswick, and was dissuaded by his family from going to California to seek his fortune.

Entrepreneur 

Snowball started his working life as a clerk in a dry goods store in Chatham, owned by John MacDougall whose daughter Margaret he married. When MacDougall died in 1866, Snowball, at the age of 27, took over the business and expanded it.

In 1871, he was a founder of the Miramichi Steam Navigation Company which soon built and operated six small steamers on the river. On his own account he purchased and operated several others. The next year he built the largest steam sawmill in the Province, milling some 170,000 board feet (400 m³) of lumber per day. He soon opened sawmills in Tracadie, Bay du Vin and Red Bank, operating a grist mill in the last community as well.

Fish attracted his attention as well, and soon Snowball had canneries on Shippegan Island and Miscou Island. In 1879, he sent 200,000 lb. of lobster to the United Kingdom.

Snowball was a tough master, hard working and expecting the same from all his employees. He vigorously put down any attempts to unionize.

Magnate 
By the 1880s, Snowball was the second largest exporter of lumber in New Brunswick, and employed 1,000 men in his various enterprises.

In 1886, Snowball constructed the Chatham Branch Railway connecting the town with the Intercolonial Railway some six miles away. Along with Alexander Gibson, Snowball constructed an extension of the railway to Gibson, N.B., some 95 miles away. In 1893, he sold his interest to Gibson.

In 1887, he was a founding member of the Chatham Telephone Exchange which was later expanded into nearby Kent, Gloucester and Restigouche counties. This enterprise was sold in 1905 to the Central Telephone Company. Next was the Chatham Electric Light Company, founded in 1888.

Political life 

He represented his area in the House of Commons of Canada as a member of the Liberal Party of Canada from 1878 to 1882.  After a period in the Senate of Canada, he served from 1902 – 1907 as Lieutenant Governor of New Brunswick.

Snowball was active in securing incorporation for the town of Chatham, and when he ran to be its first mayor in 1896, he was defeated by a local doctor by two votes.

Local Grandee 

Snowball and his wife (called "Lady Snowball" by the locals) maintained a splendid town residence called "Wellington Villa" at the town's most important intersection, and lived in great style, often entertaining with many servants and fine furniture.

Legacy 

Snowball died in 1907 at the age of 69, a wealthy and influential man. But, changing fortunes and a lack of the same great entrepreneurial flair in the next generation prevented a dynasty being established. His businesses were divided among his children and gradually frittered away.

Snowball's mill in Chatham was caught up in the postwar depression of 1919 and closed.

Electoral record

References 
Biography at the Dictionary of Canadian Biography Online
 

1837 births
1907 deaths
Canadian senators from New Brunswick
Liberal Party of Canada MPs
Liberal Party of Canada senators
Lieutenant Governors of New Brunswick
Members of the House of Commons of Canada from New Brunswick
Pre-Confederation Canadian businesspeople
People from Miramichi, New Brunswick